Zazie is a French singer-songwriter and fashion model.

Zazie also may refer to:
 Zazie Beetz (born 1991), a German-born American actress
 Zazie dans le Métro (novel), a 1959 novel by Raymond Queneau; sometimes titled as just Zazie
 Zazie dans le Métro (film), a 1960 film and adaptation of the novel; sometimes titled as just Zazie
 Manga/video/anime works:    
 Mademoiselle Zazie, a 2013 cartoon series
 Zazie Rainyday, character in Negima! Magister Negi Magi manga and anime
 Zazie the Beast, a character in Trigun manga and anime
 Zazie the Sunflower Girl, a character in Boktai video games
 Zazie Winters, a character in Tegami Bachi manga and anime

See also
Zaza (disambiguation)